Sar Gaz is a village in Esfandaqeh Rural District, in the Central District of Jiroft County, Kerman Province, Iran. At the 2006 census, its population was 32, in 7 families.

References 

Populated places in Jiroft County